Ardajan (also Romanized as Ardajān and Ardejān; also known as  Ardeh Jān and Ardekhdzhan) is a village in Dinachal Rural District, Pareh Sar District, Rezvanshahr County, Gilan Province, Iran. At the 2006 census, its population was 5,522, in 1,441 families.

References 

Populated places in Rezvanshahr County